Adama Mbengue (born 1 December 1993) is a Senegalese professional footballer who plays as a left-back for French club Châteauroux.

Career

Club
After being scouted in Senegal during his time with Orlando City Academy Affiliate, Sport Galaxy, Mbengue played with Orlando City in the 2012 Walt Disney World Pro Soccer Classic at the age of 19 and later joined USL PDL club Orlando City U-23, where he made 10 appearances in 2012.

On 21 June 2012, Mbengue was promoted to Orlando City's senior roster, making him the first player in club history to be promoted from the U23s to the pro side. He made his professional debut the following day in a 3–0 win over the Harrisburg City Islanders.

In the 2013 Lamar Hunt U.S. Open Cup, Mbengue made a major impact on Orlando City's run to the quarterfinals. He scored in a second-round win over the Ocala Stampede and set up Long Tan for the only goal of the game in a 1–0 upset of Major League Soccer club and defending tournament champion Sporting Kansas City on 12 June.

In June 2017, Mbengue joined Ligue 1 side Caen on a four-year contract.

On 19 July 2021, he signed a one-year contract with Châteauroux in the third tier.

International career
On 17 June 2018, Adama Mbengue was called up to the Senegal squad for the 2018 FIFA World Cup to replace Saliou Ciss who injured himself in training.

Career statistics

International

References

External links

1993 births
Living people
Senegalese footballers
Senegalese expatriate footballers
Senegal international footballers
Association football fullbacks
People from Rufisque
Orlando City U-23 players
Orlando City SC (2010–2014) players
Diambars FC players
Stade Malherbe Caen players
LB Châteauroux players
Championnat National players
USL League Two players
USL Championship players
Ligue 1 players
Senegal Premier League players
Expatriate soccer players in the United States
Expatriate footballers in France
Senegalese expatriate sportspeople in the United States
Senegalese expatriate sportspeople in France
2015 Africa U-23 Cup of Nations players
African Games gold medalists for Senegal
African Games medalists in football
2018 FIFA World Cup players
Competitors at the 2015 African Games